Kala bhuna is a meat curry made of beef or mutton, originated in Chittagong, Bangladesh. Different types of spices are needed to prepare this traditional dish of Chittagong. In Bengali, the word kala or kalo means black and bhuna means deep fry. Kala bhuna gets its name from its appearance, as the meat goes blackish during a long process of deep frying it with a plenty of spices. It has become popular also in other Bangladeshi cities like Sylhet,  Khulna, Dhaka etc. Nowadays, this dish is also a favorite delicacy in mezbans, weddings, eids and in sehri or iftar during the time of Ramadan. Usually, Kala bhuna is eaten with plain rice, polao, porota, naan or ruti.

Ingredients
Kala bhuna can be made of both beef and mutton, but beef Kala bhuna is more popular. This meat dish is cooked with various ingredients by adding them gradually. The ingredients used in it are as follows:

beef or mutton
chopped and cubed onion
ginger
garlic
chili
cumin powder
coriander powder
cardamom
cinnamon
clove
chilli powder
turmeric powder
black pepper
salt
mustard oil
gorom moshla
nutmeg powder
toasted cumin powder

References

Bangladeshi meat dishes